The Dragoman Marsh is the biggest natural karst wetland in Bulgaria. It is situated only 35 km north-west from Sofia and covers a valley between the limestone hills Tri Ushi and Chepan.

Ecology
The marsh is a protected sanctuary for birds. Over 200 species have been recorded in the area. Some of them have a high conservation status. The marsh is also home to more than 140 plant species. 

Among the over 200 species of birds, the following species can be seen in the marsh:
Eurasian bittern
Western osprey
Purple heron
Short-toed eagle
Peregrine falcon
Long-legged buzzard
Black stork
Ferruginous duck
Black-winged stilt
Common raven
White stork 

The area is often visited by nature lovers and environmentalists, who can use the watchtower and eco-route provided at no cost.

History
For years, the Dragoman Marsh has played an important role in flood control and agriculture in the surrounding areas.

In the 1950s, the Dragoman Marsh was drained to make room for agricultural development. However, drainage activities were halted in the early 1990s and the marsh began to revert to its original state. Currently, threats to the marsh include pollution by untreated wastewater.

The Dragonman Marsh was proclaimed a Ramsar site on February 2, 2012. At 14967 HA, it is the second biggest such site in Bulgaria after Belene Islands.

See also 
 Aldomirovtsi Marsh

References

Marshes of Bulgaria
Landforms of Sofia Province
Protected areas of Bulgaria
Ramsar sites in Bulgaria
Tourist attractions in Sofia Province